Élodie Frenck is a Peruvian–Swiss–French actress, born 31 July 1974 in Lausanne, Switzerland. She is known for playing the character of Marlène Leroy in the French TV series Les Petits Meurtres d'Agatha Christie.

Biography 
Frenck obtained her baccalauréat in 1993. She studied drama at the Belle de Mai, then at the Cours Florent from 1994 to 1997. She took part in a Swiss improvisation league from 1989 to 1997.

She made herself known on television and was gradually offered theatre and film roles. On 16 September 2013 she won the Prix jeune espoir féminin (Aspiring Young Female) at the Festival de la Rochelle for her portrayal of Marlène in the France 2 show Les Petits Meurtres d'Agatha Christie.

She was in Thailand when the tsunami of 2004 struck, making her a survivor of the event.

On 16 September 2011, she gave birth to her son Abel. In December 2016, she announced that she was expecting another child, giving birth to her second son Esteban Abraham in March 2017. Her second son is the third son of her husband Hervé Ruet.

Filmography

Cinema

Feature films

Short films

Television

TV series

TV movies 

 2000: La Femme by mon mari by Charlotte Brandström: Agathe
 2002: Notes sur le rire by Daniel Losset: Estelle Tardieu
 2003: Une amie en or by Éric Woreth: Émilie
 2004: Le fond by l'air est frais by Laurent Carcélès: Sophie
 2008: Le secret du monde englouti by Jean by Segonzac: Cara
 2011: Bienvenue à Bouchon by Luc Béraud: Mademoiselle Odile
 2012: Mange by Virgile Bramly and Julia Ducournau: Shirley
 2013: Les Complices by Christian Vincent: Clothilde
 2014: Vogue la vie by Claire by la Rochefoucauld
 2015: La Clinique du Docteur H by Olivier Barma: Cathy
 2018: Le Pont du Diable by Sylvie Ayme: Marina Fazergues

Theatre 

 1996: The Taming of the Shrew by William Shakespeare, staged by Pascal Goethals at the Nouveau Théâtre populaire des Flandres
 1996: Arlequin poli par l'amour by Marivaux, staged by Cédric Prevost
 2005: Comme par hasard by Élodie Frenck, Magali Giraudo et Vincent Lecoq, staged by Kên Higelin at Ciné 13 Théâtre
 2006: Jour de neige by Elsa Valensi, staged by Philippe Lellouche at the Palais des glaces

Distinctions and awards

Awards 

 Festival de la fiction TV de La Rochelle 2013: Prix jeune espoir féminin (Aspiring Young Female) for Les Petits Meurtres d'Agatha Christie

Notes and references

External links 
 
 Entretien avec Élodie Frenck sur 20 minutes

French television actresses
1974 births
Living people
French film actresses
People from Lausanne
French stage actresses
20th-century French actresses
21st-century French actresses